Albert River may refer to:

 Albert River (Victoria), in Gippsland, southeastern Victoria, Australia
 Albert River (South East Queensland), in southeastern Queensland, Australia
 Albert River (Gulf Savannah), in northwestern Queensland, Australia